The Decline of Civilization: Why We Need To Return To Gandhi And Tagore is a 2017 book by Ramin Jahanbegloo with a foreword by Romila Thapar in which the author provides a political and philosophical investigation of the idea of civilization and asks whether our age is lacking a civilizational resource.

Reception
The book was reviewed in The Financial Express, Lacuna and Mainstream Weekly.

See also
The Decline of the West

References

External links 

2017 non-fiction books
English-language books
Books in political philosophy
Social philosophy literature
Books about capitalism
Aleph Book Company books
Books about Mahatma Gandhi
Works about Rabindranath Tagore
Books about civilizations